Beacon Theatre, also known as the Broadway Theatre and Pythian Lodge, is a historic theatre building located at Hopewell, Virginia.

History 
It was built in 1928, and is a three-story, vaudeville and movie theater with storefront commercial space, second-floor apartments and third-floor meeting space. It has Colonial Revival and Art Deco style details. The building features decorative bands of flush brickwork punctuated with rectangular cast-stone corner blocks and cast-stone detailing in the parapet coping; the theater is adorned with classical plaster friezes, an elaborate proscenium, and a cove ceiling in the auditorium. The Beacon Theatre remained a theater offering live performances and movies until it closed in 1981.  It later reopened.

It was listed on the National Register of Historic Places in 2000.

References

Theatres on the National Register of Historic Places in Virginia
Art Deco architecture in Virginia
Colonial Revival architecture in Virginia
Theatres completed in 1928
Buildings and structures in Hopewell, Virginia
National Register of Historic Places in Hopewell, Virginia
Individually listed contributing properties to historic districts on the National Register in Virginia
1928 establishments in Virginia